Kerry Montgomery (born 25 March 1988) is a Northern Irish footballer who plays as a midfielder and has appeared for the Northern Ireland women's national team.

Career
Montgomery has been capped for the Northern Ireland national team, appearing for the team during the 2019 FIFA Women's World Cup qualifying cycle.

References

External links
 
 
 

1988 births
Living people
Women's association footballers from Northern Ireland
Northern Ireland women's international footballers
Women's association football midfielders
Glasgow City F.C. players
Motherwell L.F.C. players
Hibernian W.F.C. players
Spartans W.F.C. players
Celtic F.C. Women players